Something More is a science fantasy novel by Paul Cornell, first published by Gollancz in 2001.  It was Cornell's first (non-tie-in) novel to be published.

The novel is set in a future Britain circa 2248, and the plot centres on the investigation of a mysterious stately home called Heartsease.

2001 British novels
British science fiction novels
Novels by Paul Cornell
Victor Gollancz Ltd books